Richi (also Romanized as Rīchī; also known as Rechī, Rījī, and Rīshī) is a village in Kuh Mareh Sorkhi Rural District, Arzhan District, Shiraz County, Fars Province, Iran. At the 2006 census, its population was 439, in 95 families.

References 

Populated places in Shiraz County